Armenia competed at the 2004 Summer Olympics in Athens, Greece from 13 to 29 August 2004.

Athletics

Armenian athletes have so far achieved qualifying standards in the following athletics events (up to a maximum of 3 athletes in each event at the 'A' Standard, and 1 at the 'B' Standard).

Key
 Note–Ranks given for track events are within the athlete's heat only
 Q = Qualified for the next round
 q = Qualified for the next round as a fastest loser or, in field events, by position without achieving the qualifying target
 NR = National record
 N/A = Round not applicable for the event
 Bye = Athlete not required to compete in round

Men
Field events

Women
Track & road events

Boxing

Judo

Shooting

Men

Swimming

Women

Tennis

Weightlifting

Wrestling

Key
  - Victory by Fall.
  - Decision by Points - the loser with technical points.
  - Decision by Points - the loser without technical points.

Men's freestyle

Men's Greco-Roman

References

External links
Official Report of the XXVIII Olympiad

2004 in Armenian sport
Nations at the 2004 Summer Olympics
2004